Windsor is an unincorporated community in southern Casey County, Kentucky, United States. Their post office is active.

References

Unincorporated communities in Casey County, Kentucky
Unincorporated communities in Kentucky